Rajko Vidović (born 4 March 1975) is a Croatian-Bosnian retired football forward who last played for Dugo Selo in Croatia's Treća HNL. He is currently manager of Croatian third-tier side Sesvete.

Club career
During his professional career he mainly played for clubs in Croatia's Prva HNL. He also spent one season in China and two seasons in Vietnam.

References

External links
 

1975 births
Living people
People from Zavidovići
Croats of Bosnia and Herzegovina
Association football forwards
Croatian footballers
Bosnia and Herzegovina footballers
Rot Weiss Ahlen players
HNK Rijeka players
NK Kamen Ingrad players
NK Zagreb players
Beijing Hongdeng players
NK Inter Zaprešić players
NK Lokomotiva Zagreb players
NK Čelik Zenica players
Song Lam Nghe An FC players
Regionalliga players
Croatian Football League players
China League One players
Premier League of Bosnia and Herzegovina players
V.League 1 players
First Football League (Croatia) players
Croatian expatriate footballers
Expatriate footballers in Germany
Croatian expatriate sportspeople in Germany
Expatriate footballers in China
Croatian expatriate sportspeople in China
Expatriate footballers in Vietnam
Croatian expatriate sportspeople in Vietnam
Croatian football managers
NK Sesvete managers